Aechmea chantinii is a bromeliad native to the Amazon Rainforest vegetation in Brazil, Venezuela, Colombia, Ecuador and Peru.  Commonly known as Amazonian zebra plant, it is often used as an ornamental plant.

The following subspecies are recognized :
Aechmea chantinii var. chantinii  (Carrière) Baker, 1889  - most of species range
Aechmea chantinii var. fuchsii H.Luther (1987 publ. 1988).   - Ecuador
There are numerous cultivars of A. chantinii.

References

External links
  Aechmea chantinii photo

chantinii
Flora of South America
Flora of the Amazon
Garden plants of South America
House plants
Plants described in 1878
Taxa named by John Gilbert Baker
Taxa named by Élie-Abel Carrière